Bohaterowie Sybiru is a 1936 Polish drama film directed by Michał Waszyński.

Cast
Adam Brodzisz ...  The Lieutenant
Eugeniusz Bodo ...  Władek
Krystyna Ankwicz ...  The Granddaughter
Kazimierz Junosza-Stępowski ...  Tsarist Officer of the Guard
Lala Górska ...  The Lieutenant's Daughter
Jan Bonecki
Feliks Chmurkowski ...  Technical Engineer
Mieczysław Cybulski ...  Roman Kłosewicz, Russ student
Stanisław Daniłowicz
Ludwik Fritsche
Stanisław Grolicki
Stefan Hnydziński
Eugeniusz Koszutski
Jan Kurnakowicz ...  Stiopa
Żenia Magierówna
Jerzy Roland
Leon Wyrwicz

External links 
 
 Bohaterowie Sybiru at the Internet Polish Movie Database 

1936 films
1930s Polish-language films
Polish black-and-white films
Films directed by Michał Waszyński
1936 drama films
Polish drama films